Good Luck to You, Leo Grande is a 2022 sex comedy-drama film directed by Sophie Hyde and written by Katy Brand. The film stars Emma Thompson and Daryl McCormack. The story revolves around a woman who seeks a young sex worker to achieve an orgasm. 

The film had its world premiere at the 2022 Sundance Film Festival on 22 January 2022, and was released on 17 June 2022, theatrically in the United Kingdom by Lionsgate, and digitally in the United States by Searchlight Pictures as a Hulu original film. The film was critically acclaimed with praise given to the films performances, specifically Thompson who received BAFTA Award, and Golden Globe Awards nominations for her performance.

Plot
In a hotel room, Nancy Stokes welcomes a male sex worker named Leo Grande. An anxious Nancy explains that she has never had an orgasm, and she has vowed never again to fake one after the death of her husband two years earlier. She is insecure about her body and age, and embarrassed at having hired Leo, and he tries to put her at ease.

Leo expresses no shame about sex work, but he reveals that his mother believes him to be an oil rig worker. Nancy shares that she is disappointed in her adult children, adding that she is a retired religious education teacher. Her husband was her only sexual partner and found oral sex demeaning, and they never deviated from unfulfilling missionary sex for thirty-one years together.

Nancy recounts her most sensual experience: as a teenager on a family holiday in Greece, a hotel worker took an interest in her; alone in the garden, he began kissing and fingering her before being interrupted, and she left the following day. Seeing Nancy aroused and relaxed by her own story, Leo kisses and fingers her.

A week later, Nancy meets Leo in the same hotel room for a second session. Though still not having achieved an orgasm, she has prepared a bucket list of sexual activities to experience for the first time, beginning with fellatio. She remains anxious, worsened by phone calls from her daughter, but Leo relaxes her through dancing and a massage. Fearing that she sacrificed her youth and potential adventures for her family, she is overwhelmed after touching a shirtless Leo, who encourages her to embrace her own body.

Leo reveals he has a younger brother in the military, from whom he is estranged, and suggests Nancy book more sessions, but she accuses him of trying to make more money. He tells her about his other clients, explaining that he obtains genuine pleasure from seeing their pleasure. Nancy sees Leo becoming aroused as he describes his work, which in turn arouses her, and she finally performs fellatio on him.

Nancy books Leo for a third session in the same room. He performs oral sex on her, the second item on her list, which she enjoys but does not bring her to orgasm. She admits to cyberstalking and uncovering Leo's real name, Connor. Upset, Leo tells her not to book him again, threatening to expose her as a client. She asks if they can be friends and encourages him to tell his family about his work, even offering to speak to his mother. Leo reveals that his mother tells people he is dead, and storms out. Returning to retrieve his phone, he angrily admits that his mother disowned him when he was fifteen, and leaves.

Nancy books Leo for a fourth session, arranging to meet in the hotel's cafe where their waitress, Becky, turns out to be her former student. Nancy thanks Leo for her newfound confidence and sexual awakening, and has discreetly recommended him to several friends. She admits her real name is Susan Robinson, and that Leo is the only true adventure she has ever had. Becky interrupts with a story about Nancy shaming her and her friends for their short skirts, calling them "sluts".

Leo has revealed his job to his brother, reconnecting with him, and explains that his mother disowned him after catching him and several friends having group sex; she no longer acknowledges his existence, even walking past him in the street. Nancy apologises to Becky for her past judgmental behaviour, confessing her real relationship to Leo and recommending his services.

Nancy and Leo enjoy a final session in their room, passionately engaging in all the remaining acts on Nancy's list, but she is still yet to orgasm. While Leo looks for a sex toy, Nancy watches him walk around naked and masturbates, giving herself her first orgasm. She thanks Leo, telling him this will be their final session, as she does not need him anymore. Alone, Nancy appreciates her own naked body.

Cast
 Emma Thompson as Nancy Stokes / Susan Robinson
 Daryl McCormack as Leo Grande / Connor
 Isabella Laughland as Becky
 Charlotte Ware as waitress 1 
 Carina Lopes as waitress 2

Production

Development and casting
In October 2020, it was announced that Emma Thompson would star in a film directed by Sophie Hyde from a screenplay by Katy Brand. The film is a joint project between Genesius Pictures and Cornerstone Films, with Debbie Gray and Adrian Politowski producing.

Daryl McCormack joined the cast in February 2021.

Hyde said that she enjoyed working with Thompson, and the two of them worked collaboratively, with the resulting film a co-creation by both of them. "We discussed a lot, listened to each other’s stories and ideas about the material."

Filming
Principal photography began on 8 March 2021 and concluded on 20 April 2021. Filming locations included London and Norwich.

Thompson's nude scene in this film was "probably the hardest thing I've ever had to do," she said.

McCormack and Thompson did not require an intimacy coordinator to orchestrate their sex scenes.

Release
Cornerstone Films handled international sales and sold the film to independent distributors. In October 2021, Lionsgate acquired UK distribution rights to the film.

The film premiered at the 2022 Sundance Film Festival, which at the last minute was changed to an online rather than in-person event because of an increase in cases of the Omicron variant during the COVID-19 pandemic in the United States, on 22 January 2022. Following the premiere, Searchlight Pictures acquired U.S. distribution rights to the film for Hulu.

On 11 March 2022, it was revealed the film would be released on Hulu on 17 June 2022. The film was also released theatrically by Lionsgate in the United Kingdom on the same date.

The film was released in Australian cinemas by Roadshow Films from 18 August 2022,<ref>{{cite web | title=Emma Thompson Wants Women Of All Ages To Enjoy Sexual Pleasure In 'Good Luck To You, Leo Grande | work=Marie Claire | date=20 June 2022 | url=https://www.marieclaire.com.au/good-luck-to-you-leo-grande-where-to-watch | access-date=15 August 2022}}</ref> with some preview screenings accompanied by a Q&A session with Hyde and cinematographer Bryan Mason in the preceding week, including in their hometown of Adelaide.

Reception
On the review aggregator website Rotten Tomatoes, the film holds an approval rating of 93% based on 221 reviews, with an average rating of 7.8/10. The website's critics consensus reads, "Sexual awakening stories aren't in short supply, but Good Luck to You, Leo Grande proves you can still tell one with a refreshing – and very funny – spin." Metacritic, which uses a weighted average, assigned the film a score of 78 out of 100, based on 34 critics, indicating "generally favorable reviews".

A review in The New York Times by Lisa Kennedy described the film as "a tart and tender probe into sex and intimacy, power dynamics and human connection." Describing the two lead actors, her review says, "Thompson is terrifically agile with the script’s zingers and revelations. A relative newcomer, McCormack moves between wit, compassion and vulnerability with grace." In a review for RogerEbert.com, critic Sheila O'Malley praised the film, writing, "It's a relief to see a film so frank about sex, and so open to sex's complexities, especially when so much of current cinema is sexless to a disheartening degree. 'Leo Grande' cares about sex for older women, and not just sex, but the baggage associated with sex, and how that baggage robs us of joy and fulfillment. Also revelatory is the film's non-judgmental attitude towards sex work. Writing for the Los Angeles Times, critic Justin Chang wrote, "Good Luck to You, Leo Grande presents itself as a corrective, with an earnestness that verges on the Utopian; for all its low-key intimacy and emotional realism, this movie knows it's selling a fantasy of its own. But it's hard not to warm to that fantasy, or to embrace its still-rare vision of a woman learning to articulate and satisfy her most human impulses. It's good for Nancy. And for us." In a review for the progressive publication People's World'', journalist Chauncey K. Robinson highlighted how the film seemingly destroyed the "mythos that women stop living for themselves after they reach a certain point in their lives."

Accolades

References

External links
 

2022 comedy-drama films
2020s American films
2020s British films
2022 independent films
2020s English-language films
2020s sex comedy films
American comedy-drama films
American sex comedy films
British comedy-drama films
British sex comedy films
Films about male prostitution
Films about prostitution in the United Kingdom
Films about sexual repression
Films about widowhood
Films impacted by the COVID-19 pandemic
Films set in hotels
Films shot in London
Films shot in Norfolk
Hulu original films
Lionsgate films
Searchlight Pictures films
Two-handers
Films about gigolos